Tom Slater is an Australian football (soccer) player who plays as a left winger for North Shore Mariners in the National Premier Leagues NSW 2.

Slater was born in Lens and played youth football with Sydney FC before starting his professional career with Central Coast Mariners. He returned to Sydney FC in 2016.

Early life
Slater was born in Lens. He is the son of former Socceroo Robbie Slater.

Playing career

Club
In 2013, Slater signed a three-year deal with Central Coast Mariners. Slater made his professional debut for the Mariners in February 2014, coming on as a substitute in a loss to Wellington Phoenix. Slater left the Mariners by mutual agreement in May 2015.

References

External links
 
 

1994 births
Living people
People from Lens, Pas-de-Calais
French footballers
Australian soccer players
French people of Australian descent
Association football midfielders
Central Coast Mariners FC players
A-League Men players
Sportspeople from Pas-de-Calais
Footballers from Hauts-de-France
Australian people of English descent